Chit San Maung is a lead guitarist of the Burmese band Iron Cross. He also founded the PTL Recording Studio and worked as music producer and chief sound engineer. He released an album named Chauk Kyo Ka Wai, the first guitar solo album in Myanmar.

Early life 
Chit San Maung was born in Nwe Khway, Hinthada Township to parents Yu Si and his wife Aye Kyi.

Personal life 
Chit San Maung married to Naw Khin Khin Moe. They have a son named Saw Moeset Aung and two daughters named Khin Sandar Maung and Khin Cathrine Maung. His daughter Nge Ngal Lay is also a guitarist and singer.

Discography 
 Chauk Kyo Ka Wai

References

Living people
Burmese musicians
Year of birth missing (living people)
People from Ayeyarwady Region